Lanoraie is a town in the Lanaudière region of Quebec, Canada, part of the D'Autray Regional County Municipality.

History
When Jacques Cartier passed through in the 16th century, the Iroquois had already established themselves in the area, calling it Agochanda or Agouchonda, meaning "place where one stops to eat and rest". It was also in this area in 1642 that Isaac Jogues was abducted by the Mohawks along with Guillaume Couture and René Goupil, and taken into captivity and tortured.

In 1672, the Intendant of New France Jean Talon granted the territory as a seignory to Louis de Niort de La Noraye (1639-1708). In 1688, the Seignory of La Noraye (also spelled as: Lanauraie, Lanoraie, Noraye) was united with the Autray Seignory, granted in 1637 to Jean Bourdon who passed it on to his son Jacques Bourdon d'Autray in 1653.

Although the Parish of Saint-Joseph-de-Lanoraie was founded in 1732, it did not really begin to develop until 1831. In 1845, this parish was incorporated as the Parish Municipality of Lanoraie, but abolished two years later in 1847, when it became part of the Berthier County Municipality. In 1855, it was reestablished as the Parish Municipality of Saint-Joseph-de-Lanoraie. In 1848, the Municipality of Lanoraie-d'Autray was formed.

On December 6, 2000, the Parish Municipality of Saint-Joseph-de-Lanoraie and the Municipality of Lanoraie-d'Autray were merged to form the new Municipality of Lanoraie.

Demographics
Population trend:
 Population in 2021: 5134 (2016 to 2021 population change: 7.2%)
 Population in 2016: 4787 
 Population in 2011: 4447 
 Population in 2006: 4067
 Population in 2001: 3869
 Population total in 1996: 3759
 Lanoraie-d'Autray: 1904
 Saint-Joseph-de-Lanoraie: 1855
 Population in 1991:
 Lanoraie-d'Autray: 1793
 Saint-Joseph-de-Lanoraie: 1562

Private dwellings occupied by usual residents: 2123 (total dwellings: 2199)

Mother tongue:
 English as first language: 1.0%
 French as first language: 95.2%
 English and French as first language: 0%
 Other as first language: 3.8%

Education

Commission scolaire des Samares operates francophone public schools, including:
 École de la Source d'Autray

The Sir Wilfrid Laurier School Board operates anglophone public schools, including:
 Joliette Elementary School in Saint-Charles-Borromée
 Joliette High School in Joliette

See also
List of municipalities in Quebec

References

External links

Incorporated places in Lanaudière
Municipalities in Quebec
Quebec populated places on the Saint Lawrence River